Fu Tei Pai is a village in Fanling, North District, Hong Kong.

Administration
Fu Tei Pai is a recognized village under the New Territories Small House Policy.

References

External links
 Delineation of area of existing village Fu Tei Pai (Fanling) for election of resident representative (2019 to 2022)

Villages in North District, Hong Kong